Thauera propionica is a Gram-negative and non-endospore-producing bacterium from the genus of Thauera which has been isolated from the Ganges river from Kanpur in India.

References

Rhodocyclaceae
Bacteria described in 2018